Asternoseiidae is a family of mites in the order Mesostigmata.

Species
Asternoseiidae contains one genus, with one recognized species:

 Genus Asternoseius Berlese, 1910
Asternoseius ciliatus Berlese, 1910

References

Mesostigmata
Acari families